Alexandra Brandon "A. B." Stoddard is an associate editor and columnist at RealClearPolitics. Previously, she worked as an associate editor and columnist for The Hill newspaper. She has been quoted by other news media.

Early life and education
Her father was former ABC Entertainment president Brandon Stoddard and her mother is the author and interior designer Alexandra Stoddard. She graduated with a degree in journalism from Connecticut College in 1989.

Career
Stoddard worked as a producer for World News Tonight (1999–2002). She covered the U.S. Senate for ABC News. She won first place in the "Weekly Newspaper – Editorial, Columns, Commentary" category of the Dateline Awards from the Society of Professional Journalists’ Washington, D.C., chapter in 2009, where the judges called her winning article "insightful". She was awarded first place in the "Weekly Newspaper – Editorial" category in 2011, and was a finalist in the 2012 awards in the "Weekly Newspaper – Editorial, Columns, Commentary" category.

Stoddard is a MSNBC and Fox News political panel member. She is a columnist on The Hill. She often appears as a guest on Special Report with Bret Baier. She is a former congressional reporter for The Hill.  On October 18, 2012, she wrote an article titled "Obama spinning toward a loss".

Personal life
Stoddard married Peter Scott Roberson on September 6, 1997. She has a sister, Brooke Stoddard.

References

External links
 

Living people
Year of birth missing (living people)
American women journalists
American political commentators
Connecticut College alumni
The Hill (newspaper) journalists
Fox News people
MSNBC people